The Pemberton Rail-Trail is a rail trail in Pemberton, New Jersey. 

It occupies a  abandoned rail corridor in Burlington County, New Jersey, 
that extends from Hanover Street in Pemberton to Birmingham Road in 
Juliustown, New Jersey.
The trail surface is stone dust, typical of rail-trail construction.

The Kinkora-Pemberton rail-trail is planned to extend the Pemberton rail-trail 
to Florence Township, New Jersey.

References

External links
 
 Pemberton NJ official web site

Rail trails in New Jersey
Protected areas of Burlington County, New Jersey
Pennsylvania Railroad lines
Bike paths in New Jersey